Charles or Charlie Craig may refer to:

Arts and entertainment
Charles Craig (actor) (fl. 1900s–1930s), American actor
Charles Craig (tenor) (1919–1997), English opera singer
Charlie Craig (songwriter) (1938–2011), American songwriter
Charlie Craig (screenwriter), American television producer and writer

Sports
Charlie Craig (footballer) (1876–1933), Scottish footballer
Charlie Craig (baseball) (1905–?), American baseball player
Charles Craig (athlete) (born 1942), American triple jumper

Others
Charles C. Craig (1865–1944), American jurist and politician
Charles Craig (British politician) (1869–1960), Northern Irish politician, Member of Parliament for South Antrim 1903–1922 and Antrim 1922–1929
Charles L. Craig (1872–1935), comptroller for New York City

See also
Craig Charles (born 1964), English actor
Charles Craig Cannon (1914–1992), US Army officer